Atlantis Sand Fynbos is a critically endangered fynbos vegetation type that occurs to the north of Cape Town, in the Western Cape, South Africa.

It is listed as critically endangered as it is home to a great many threatened Red List species.

See also
 Biodiversity of Cape Town
 Cape Flats Sand Fynbos
 Hangklip Sand Fynbos
 :Category:Fynbos

References

Fynbos ecosystems
Flora of South Africa
Vegetation types of Cape Town